Beaver Gut Ditch is a  long 1st order tributary to St. Jones River in Kent County, Delaware.

Course
Beaver Gut Ditch rises in a pond on the Thorndyk Branch divide about 0.25 miles west of Magnolia in Kent County, Delaware.  Beaver Gut Ditch then flows northeast to meet the St. Jones River at Florence, Delaware.

Watershed
Beaver Gut Ditch drains  of area, receives about 44.8 in/year of precipitation, has a topographic wetness index of 579.16 and is about 5.1% forested.

See also
List of Delaware rivers

Maps

References

Rivers of Delaware
Rivers of Kent County, Delaware